Beginning in 1870, the city of Pittsburgh, Pennsylvania built numerous inclined railways to provide passenger service to workers traveling the steep hills to their homes; there were 17 built in the late 19th century. Following road building and greater use of private automobiles, the inclines business declined and most were closed and removed. 

The Monongahela Incline, the first built in the city, and the Duquesne Incline are the only two still operating. They carry passengers between Mount Washington and the lowlands along the Monongahela River. They are each listed on the National Register of Historic Places and, in 1977, both were recognized as Historic Mechanical Engineering Landmarks by the American Society of Mechanical Engineers (ASME).

Further: H.B. Hays and Brothers Coal Railroad

External links
 A video of the Monongahela and Knoxville inclines operating in Pittsburgh during 1926. The Monongahela Freight incline can also be seen in the video.

References

 
Railway inclines